John Leisenring (June 3, 1853 – January 19, 1901) was an American politician from Pennsylvania who served as a Republican member of the U.S. House of Representatives for Pennsylvania's 12th congressional district from 1895 to 1897.

Formative years
John Leisenring was born in Ashton, Pennsylvania, now known as Lansford, Carbon County, Pennsylvania. He attended two public schools, Schwartz’s Academy in Bethlehem, Pennsylvania, and an academy in Merchantville and Princeton, New Jersey. He became a civil and mining engineer and was identified with banking, coal, iron, and lumber industries. He moved from Mauch Chunk, Pennsylvania to Upper Lehigh, Pennsylvania, in 1885.

Political career
A Republican, Leisenring was a member of the Pennsylvania State House of Representatives in 1894 and 1895, and was then elected to the Fifty-fourth Congress. He declined to be a candidate for reelection in 1896. He was a delegate to the Republican State convention in 1896. He resumed his former business pursuits and served as president of the Upper Lehigh Coal Company.

Death and interment
Leisenring died in Philadelphia in 1901, and was interred in the City Cemetery at Mauch Chunk. He was 47 at the time of his death.

Sources

The Political Graveyard

1853 births
1901 deaths
American bankers
Republican Party members of the Pennsylvania House of Representatives
Politicians from Philadelphia
Politicians from Bethlehem, Pennsylvania
Republican Party members of the United States House of Representatives from Pennsylvania
19th-century American politicians
19th-century American businesspeople